American Citizens Abroad (ACA) is a 501(c)(4) organization, organized as a Delaware corporation. Its sister organization, American Citizens Abroad Global Foundation (ACAGF), is a 501(c)(3) organization. Together, referred to as ACA, it is a leading representative of Americans residing outside the U.S.

ACA maintains close contacts with a caucus within the U.S. Congress established under the direction of Congresswoman Carolyn Maloney. ACA interfaces with subsequent government administrations and other agencies in an attempt to change laws and regulations that it believes place Americans overseas at a disadvantage to that of their fellow citizens living inside the United States. ACA sends a monthly news update to its members with information on new legislation, rules and events which affect U.S. citizens, whether living overseas or in the U.S.

ACA's web site also contains information on issues of concern to Americans overseas, including transmission of citizenship to offspring, taxation and voting. On taxation, ACA has written various pieces in its ongoing efforts to preserve the foreign earned income exclusion (FEIE), which is vital for Americans living and working overseas to avoid full double taxation.

Recently ACA played a significant role in improving the ballot request form used for absentee voting. Banking is another area of current activity to counteract disadvantages felt by American citizens abroad, who often cannot open new bank accounts, neither in the States because they have no address there to satisfy the Patriot Act, nor overseas because of the extra paperwork requirements imposed by the new Foreign Account Tax Compliance Act (FATCA).  ACA works with U.S. embassies and other groups in a bipartisan manner on issues of common concern; it has co-organized town meetings across Switzerland producing a 10-page report; ACA founder, the late Andy Sundberg,  was a moving force behind this exercise.
Anyone interested in country contacts within host nations may contact ACA's main offices online for such information.

See also
United States citizenship
Voting rights in the United States
Uniformed and Overseas Citizens Absentee Voting Act
FATCA agreement between Canada and the United States

References

External links 

501(c)(4) nonprofit organizations
American diaspora
Organisations based in Geneva
American expatriate organizations
Non-profit organisations based in Switzerland
Organizations established in 1978
1978 establishments in Switzerland
Citizenship of the United States